Mega Mindy is a Flemish children's television series with a supernatural/superhero drama theme. The series was created by Studio 100 and airs on the Flemish TV channel Ketnet. It centers around a young woman, Mieke, (Free Souffriau), who lives with her grandparents and works as a police officer but also has a secret identity as superhero Mega Mindy. She tries to keep it a secret, but falls in love with Toby (Louis Talpe) who also works at the police. He is in love with Mega Mindy and does not know that Mieke secretly likes him and is actually Mega Mindy. She tries to find a way to balance between work and being a superhero, but it is not always easy.

Every episode has a new mystery that Mieke has to solve and one or more bad guys whom Mega Mindy takes down. Mieke's not-so-smart boss always tries to solve the case, but Mega Mindy usually ends up with the solution, which he does not appreciate. He does manage to claim responsibility for capturing a bad guy on several occasions because Mega Mindy cannot reveal herself.

Cast

Main characters
 Free Souffriau as Mieke Fonkel/Mega Mindy (2006–present)
 Louis Talpe as Toby (2006–present)
 Anton Cogen as Commissaris Kamiel Migrain (2007–present)
 Sjarel Branckaerts as Commissaris Emiel Migrain (2006–2007)
 Fred Van Kuyk as Grandpa Fonkel (2006–present)
 Nicky Langley as Grandma Fonkel (2006–present)
 Matthias Temmermans as Beep (2006–present)

Side Characters

 Megan W. as main side chick (S1 E8)
 Lyanne R. as Side chick (S2 E13)
 Ilse J. as Side chick (S2 E18)
 Anneke P. as Side chick (S4 E2)

Powers
Mega Mindy has several superhero powers. She is able to run very fast and teleport to any place she wants.

Adaptations

"Mega Mindy" was adapted into several stage shows and four films, released in respectively 2009, 2010, 2011 and 2015.

Trivia
The original boss of Mieke and Toby in the series was replaced by his younger brother. In reality the actor who played their boss, Sjarel Branckaerts, died.

2000s Belgian television series
2006 Belgian television series debuts
Belgian children's television shows
Belgian drama television shows
Television superheroes
Fictional characters from Flanders
Fictional Belgian police officers
Fictional characters who can move at superhuman speeds
Fictional characters who can teleport
Superhero comedy television series
Television shows adapted into films
Television shows adapted into plays
Television shows adapted into comics
Female characters in television
Ketnet original programming